The Oliver 500 utility tractor was built between 1961 and 1963 by David Brown Ltd. in England for the Oliver Farm Equipment Company, and marketed in North America by Oliver.

Description and production
The Oliver 500 was a David Brown 850 tractor, restyled as an Oliver, and marketed to the same general market segment as the Oliver 550. The 500 used a David Brown engine with  displacement with a six-speed transmission, produced in gasoline and diesel versions. The 500 was sold between 1961 and 1963, at a price in 1963 of $2,670. 1,648 were built.

References

500
Vehicles introduced in 1961